Gazi Abdul Haq  is a Bangladesh Nationalist Party politician and Physician. He was elected a member of parliament from Khulna-5 in February 1996.

Career 
Gazi Abdul Haq is a physician. In 1993, he was the Secretary General of the Bangladesh Medical Association. He then joined the Bangladesh Nationalist Party (BNP).

He was elected to parliament from Khulna-5 as a Bangladesh Nationalist Party candidate in 15 February 1996 Bangladeshi general election.

He was nominated vice president in 2009 at the Khulna district BNP conference.

References 

Living people
Year of birth missing (living people)
People from Khulna District
Bangladesh Nationalist Party politicians
Bangladeshi physicians
6th Jatiya Sangsad members